Asa Smith (October 23, 1829 – September 29, 1907) was Warden of the Borough of Norwalk, Connecticut from 1863 to 1865, from 1870 to 1871 and from 1873 to 1874. He also was a member of the Connecticut House of Representatives representing Norwalk from 1869 to 1870, and was a member of the Connecticut Senate representing the 13th District from 1885 to 1886.

Associations 
 Member (1853), Master (1857) St. John's Masonic Lodge, No. 6
 High Priest (1858–1860), Washington Chapter, No. 24
 Grand High Priest (1863-1864), Grand Chapter Royal Arch Masons of Connecticut
 Eminent Commander (1867–1873), Clinton Commandery
 Grand Junior Deacon (1865), Grand Master (1870); Grand Lodge

References 

1829 births
1907 deaths
American potters
American Freemasons
Connecticut state senators
Mayors of Norwalk, Connecticut
Members of the Connecticut House of Representatives
19th-century American politicians